The Alba was a French car made by Constructions Métallurgiques, Usines Alba, Suresnes, Seine between 1913 and 1928.

Engines
The car was offered with a choice of 4-cylinder engines, including a side-valve  of 1172 cc made by S.C.A.P., a 1476 cc overhead-valve by S.C.A.P., and a 1994 cc Altos with either side valves or overhead valves.

Transmission and brakes
The rear wheels were driven through a 4-speed gearbox. Albas were also fitted with front-wheel brakes, an advanced feature on a light car of the time. In 1921 a smaller 1243 cc model, the Bobby Alba, was offered with 3-speed gearbox.

Racing
In 1924, Alba entered the Le Mans 24-hour race, but without success.

See also
 Alba (1907 automobile)
 Alba (1952 automobile)

References

Vintage vehicles
Defunct motor vehicle manufacturers of France

Cars introduced in 1913
1920s cars
Suresnes